Tønder Festival is an annual folk music festival in Tønder, Denmark. It is held on the last weekend of August. It was founded in 1974. The first festival took place in 1975.

The festival is one of the most prominent festivals for traditional and modern folk music in Europe. Around 2500 volunteers helps create the festival every year.

The program is composed of international artists from especially Ireland, Scotland, Canada, United States, England & Scandinavia. The genres vary from Irish and Scottish folk music to Nordic Folk Music, Americana, Country and world.

During the festival, the entire town is influenced by music, and famous and less famous artists are part of a community with the audience on streets and squares.

The festival takes place at the festival area, with room for up to 15.000 people. You can buy a 4-day wristband or limited day tickets.

Amongst the artists who have visited the festival are John Prine, Emmylou Harris, Steve Earle, Jason Isbell, Sturgill Simpson, Colter Wall, Pete Seeger, Arlo Guthrie, Runrig, Lukas Graham, Great Big Sea, The Chieftains, Altan, Eivør Pálsdóttir, Ramblin' Jack Elliott, Donovan, Natalie MacMaster, Wolfstone, Mary Black, Margo Price, Capercaillie, Karan Casey, Jacob Dinesen, The Lone Bellow, Darlingside, The Avett Brothers, Red Hot Chili Pipers, Marck Cohn, The Mavericks and many many more.

Official site.
Hagge's Musik Pub is a venue and pub run by The Friends of Tønder Festival
FolkWorld: A bottle of Tønder audience - Tønder Festival 2000

References

Music festivals in Denmark
1975 establishments in Denmark
Tønder Municipality
Tourist attractions in the Region of Southern Denmark
Music festivals established in 1975
Folk festivals in Denmark
Summer events in Denmark